Arthur Chivichyan (born May 16, 1990) is an Armenian-American professional judoka and professor at University of Southern California.

Career
Chivichyan is the founder of the Elite Institute, an alternate educational and development institute for youth and young adults. He is also a professor at University of Southern California, Donrsife College of Letters, Arts and Sciences.

Martial arts career
Chivichyan is a 4th degree black belt in judo and is the lead instructor at Hayastan MMA Academy. He is a six-time national judo champion. Chivichyan was a member of the United States national judo team. He has trained under Gene LeBell.

Personal life
Chivichyan's father is Gokor Chivichyan a judo, submission grappling, and mixed martial arts instructor who has trained Ronda Rousey, Karo Parisyan, Manvel Gamburyan and others. His brother Gary Chivichyan is professional basketball player for Agua Caliente Clippers.

References

External links
Faculty Profile > USC Dana and David Dornsife College of Letters, Arts and Sciences
PressReader.com - Digital Newspaper & Magazine Subscriptions
Meet Arthur Chivichyan | Educational Leader & Coach
JudoInside - Arthur Chivichyan Judoka
Gary and Arthur Chivichyan The US Armenian of The Month Season 1, Episode 4
LA’s Armenian community wrestles with culture loss amid pandemic

American male judoka
1990 births
Living people